Arthur Emanuel Christensen (9 January 1875 – 31 March 1945) was a Danish orientalist and scholar of Iranian philology and folklore. He is best known for his works on the Iranian history, mythology, religions and medicine.

Biography
Christensen was born in Copenhagen in 1875. He received his doctorate in 1903. The book One Thousand and One Nights ignited his interest to the Middle East. The subject of his doctorate dissertation was written about Omar Khayyam, a renowned Persian polymath. In 1919 he was promoted to the professorship at the University of Copenhagen, being the first Danish academic to hold this title in the field of Iranian philology.

Selected bibliography

References

External links

Writers from Copenhagen
19th-century Danish writers
Iranologists
1875 births
1945 deaths
Members of the Göttingen Academy of Sciences and Humanities
20th-century Danish writers
Academic staff of the University of Copenhagen